Haley McGregor or Hayley McGregor is a retired Australian runner.

2002 Commonwealth Games
At the 2002 Commonwealth Games, she finished 11th in the Women's 5000 metres.  She was the national champion in 2002 at that distance to secure her Commonwealth Games spot.

2004 Olympics
At the 2004 Olympics, she finished 25th in the Women's 10,000 metres.  She was national runner-up in 2004 at that distance, but since she was defeated by someone with the A-Standard she was also selected to compete.

Other running achievements
She has competed multiple times at the IAAF World Cross Country Championships.

She was a multiple-time winner of the Zatopek Classic.  In the 2004 race she earned her Olympic qualifying time.

In 2003 and 2004, she won both the City to Surf in Sydney and the Burnie Ten.

In addition, she was runner-up in the 2005 Rock 'n' Roll Arizona Marathon.

Kayak career
McGregor was an accomplished kayak athlete.  She earned a scholarship to the Victorian Institute of Sport and won multiple Victoria championships.

References

External links

Living people
1979 births
Australian female long-distance runners
Australian female marathon runners
Athletes (track and field) at the 2004 Summer Olympics
Olympic athletes of Australia
Athletes (track and field) at the 2002 Commonwealth Games
Commonwealth Games competitors for Australia